The Emirates Cup is a pre-season association football invitational competition hosted by English club Arsenal at their home ground, Emirates Stadium, in Holloway, London. The two-day competition was inaugurated in 2007 and is named after Arsenal's main sponsor, Emirates. It has been held every summer except 2012 due to the London Olympics, 2016 because of pitch renovation work, 2018 because of stadium building work, and 2020 and 2021 due to the COVID-19 pandemic.

The competition in its first decade followed a point scoring system much like the Amsterdam Tournament, whereby each team played two matches, with three points awarded for a win, one point for a draw and none for a loss. An additional point is awarded for every goal scored; this was scrapped in 2011, but made a return from the 2013 edition. From 2009, total shots on target throughout the tournament has been used as a tiebreaker if teams are tied on points, goal difference and goals scored. Since 2019, the Emirates Cup has been shortened to a one-day tournament with the inclusion of Arsenal Women.

Arsenal won the inaugural tournament in 2007, and further wins followed in 2009, 2010, 2015, 2017, and most recently 2022. Five other sides have won the Emirates Cup: Hamburg in 2008, New York Red Bulls in 2011, Galatasaray in 2013, Valencia in 2014 and Lyon in 2019. Lyon and Paris Saint-Germain are the most regular guests, both having been invited to compete in the tournament on three occasions; Lyon won the tournament and finished as runners-up once, while PSG finished as runners-up twice.

History
Arsenal first announced their intention to stage a pre-season competition at their home ground, the Emirates Stadium, in March 2007. Managing director Keith Edelman revealed plans were at an exploratory stage, and added: "It would be in pre-season, around late July, and tickets would be reasonably priced. We feel it could be a really exciting event." Details of the tournament were formally announced on 1 May 2007, with Italian champions Inter Milan, French side Paris Saint-Germain and German outfit Hamburg confirmed as participants. Hamburg's qualification into the Intertoto Cup meant they withdrew from the competition; the club were subsequently replaced by Spain's Valencia. 

The inaugural Emirates Cup took place on 28 July and 29 July 2007 and was well attended with over 110,000 people filling the stadium across the two-day tournament. Each club played two sides; Valencia and Arsenal did not face each other, and Inter did not play against Paris Saint-Germain. Arsenal won the first tournament, having beaten their French opponents 2–1 and defeated Inter by the same scoreline, courtesy of a late strike by Robin van Persie . The following year Hamburg made an appearance alongside Real Madrid and Juventus, and won the tournament as they finished two points clear of second-place Real.

In 2009, Arsenal welcomed Atlético Madrid, Rangers and Paris Saint-Germain to the Emirates Cup. The hosts regained the trophy winning both of their matches and scoring five goals; midfielder Jack Wilshere was twice named man of the match for his performances against Atlético Madrid and Rangers. Arsenal retained the Emirates Cup in 2010, but failed to top the table in the next three tournaments. New York Red Bulls, who were captained by former Arsenal striker Thierry Henry, won the Emirates Cup in 2011, after beating Paris Saint-Germain and drawing with the hosts. The tournament did not take place in 2012 due to the ongoing Summer Olympics in London; it was believed that the capital's infrastructure was not able to cater for the extra 100,000 supporters that usually attend the two-day event. When the Emirates Cup resumed in 2013, Turkish side Galatasaray earned nine points to finish top of the group, and a year later Valencia became the first Spanish winners of the tournament as the hosts lost their decisive game against Monaco.

Arsenal claimed their fourth Emirates Cup in 2015; the competition was held on the final weekend of July. The hosts scored seven goals in the tournament – six against Lyon, who later became the first team in the competition's history not to score a goal in either of their matches. Due to the extended schedule of UEFA Euro 2016 and essential pitch reconstruction works at the Emirates Stadium, the Emirates Cup did not take place in the pre-season period of the 2016–17 season.  Two years later, stadium building work meant that once again the tournament did not take place.

The Emirates Cup returned in 2019 with Arsenal Women featuring for the first time in the pre-season tournament, where they faced Bayern Munich Women. In the men's tournament, Lyon defeated Arsenal 2–1 to win their first title.

Tournaments

Performance by team

Men's

Women's

See also
Wembley Cup

References

External links 

 
Arsenal F.C.
The Emirates Group
International club association football competitions hosted by London
English football friendly trophies
2007 establishments in England
Recurring sporting events established in 2007